Emerald Heights College for Women, is a women's general degree college located at Ooty, The Nilgiris District, Tamil Nadu. It was established in the year 1969. The college is affiliated with Bharathiar University. This college offers different courses in arts, commerce and science.

Departments

Science
Mathematics
Computer Science
Zoology

Arts and Commerce
Tamil
English
History
Commerce

Accreditation
The college is  recognized by the University Grants Commission (UGC).

See also
Education in India
Literacy in India
List of colleges in the Nilgiris district
List of institutions of higher education in Tamil Nadu

References

External links

Educational institutions established in 1969
1969 establishments in Tamil Nadu
Colleges affiliated to Bharathiar University
Education in Ooty